Maurice Ephrussi (18 November 1849 – 29 October 1916) was a French banker and horsebreeder.

Early life
Maurice Ephrussi was born on November 18, 1849, in Odessa, Russian Empire. He was a member of the Ephrussi family. His father, Charles Joachim Ephrussi (1792-1864), was a trader in wheat who founded a bank, Ephrussi & Co., and his mother was Henriette  (1822-1888). His elder half-brother, Ignace von Ephrussi, founded a branch of the family bank in Vienna, Austria.

Career

With his older brother, Michel Ephrussi, Maurice co-founded a branch of Ephrussi & Co. in Paris, France.

Equestrian interests
Maurice Ephrussi and his brother Michel were both involved in the sport of Thoroughbred horse racing. Maurice owned Haras du Gazon, a breeding farm in Bazoches-au-Houlme, Orne, Normandy where he bred the outstanding runner and champion sire, Perth. Perth's sire was the Ephrussi stallion War Dance who also sired the brilliant filly Roxelane.

Horses raced by Maurice Ephrussi won a number of important races in France and England, including the
Cambridgeshire Handicap - (1) - Alicante (1907)
La Coupe - (1) - Bariolet (1882)
Prix de la Forêt - (2) - Seymour (1879) Alicante (1889)
Prix du Cadran - (1) - Bariolet (1882)
Prix du Jockey Club - (1) - Mordant (1907)
Prix Gladiateur - (1) - Bariolet (1882)
Prix du Nabob - (2) - Alicante (1890), Chapeau Chinois (1893)
Prix Royal-Oak - (1) - Alicante (1890)
Prix Jean Prat  - (1) - Alicante (1891)

Haras du Gazon was later purchased by American horseman, Herman B. Duryea.

Personal life
Ephrussi married Béatrice de Rothschild, the daughter of Alphonse de Rothschild, a member of the Rothschild banking family of France. The wedding took place on June 5, 1883, in Paris. They maintained a home in Paris, a villa in Monte Carlo called "Rose de France", and in the early 1900s built Villa Ephrussi de Rothschild at Saint-Jean-Cap-Ferrat.

The marriage quickly turned to disaster for Béatrice, as she caught syphilis from Maurice which prevented her from having children. Maurice was a big gambler and in 1904 his debts amounted to more than 12 million gold francs, the equivalent of 30 million euros today. Worried about the future, the Rothschild family decided to take Maurice to court to demand a separation. They won the case and, in June 1904, after 21 years of marriage, Béatrice de Rothschild and Maurice Ephrussi were separated.

Maurice and Béatrice Ephrussi were avid art collectors and his cousin, Charles Ephrussi, proprietor of the Gazette des Beaux-Arts in Paris, was a patron of the Impressionists.

Maurice Ephrussi died in 1916. Béatrice lived the rest of her life in Davos where she died in 1934.

References
Notes

Sources
 Pinçon, Michel. Grand fortunes: dynasties of wealth in France (1998) Algora Publishing 
 Information on Haras du Gazon in the 14 May 1922 (edition 1) of the Daily Racing Form
 La Lettre de l'Académie des Beaux-Arts : La Villa Ephrussi de Rothschild" (numero 59 - janvier 2010) Friends of Villa Ephrussi de Rothschild

1849 births
1916 deaths
French bankers
French racehorse owners and breeders
French art collectors
Odesa Jews
Jewish bankers
Rothschild family
Maurice
Emigrants from the Russian Empire to France